Sean Michael O'Bryan (born September 10, 1963) is an American film and television actor from Louisville, Kentucky. He attended and graduated from St. Xavier High School.

Career
He co-starred with William Ragsdale on the series Brother's Keeper. Early television work includes guest roles on such television series as Married... with Children, MacGyver, Northern Exposure, Cold Case, Diagnosis: Murder, Quantum Leap, Murder, She Wrote, Chicago Hope, Roswell (season 3 episode 9), Roseanne (season 8 episode 19), Six Feet Under, Criminal Minds, The King of Queens and Dexter. More recent television credits include CSI, Bones, Melissa & Joey, Hot In Cleveland, The Mentalist, Leverage. He appears in the recurring role of Ron Donahue on The Middle.

His film credits include Chaplin, Crimson Tide, Phenomenon, Exit to Eden, Out to Sea, Big Fat Liar, Detective, Deck the Halls, I'll Be Home For Christmas, Yes Man, Vantage Point and both Princess Diaries films. His more recent films include Playing for Keeps, Olympus Has Fallen, London Has Fallen and Mother's Day.

Personal life
O'Bryan moved to Los Angeles in the early  1990s, where he now resides with his wife, actress Samantha Follows (sister of Canadian-American actress Megan Follows), and their two daughters.

Filmography

Films

Television

References

External links
 
 O'Bryan infosite

1963 births
Living people
20th-century American male actors
21st-century American male actors
Male actors from Louisville, Kentucky
American male film actors
American male stage actors
American male television actors
St. Xavier High School (Louisville) alumni